Brownlee is an English or Scottish toponymic surname, named after Brownlee, Lanarkshire or Brownley, Warwickshire. Notable people with the surname include:

Alistair Brownlee (born 1988), British triathlete
Bruce Brownlee, New Zealand squash player
Charles Brownlee (1821–1890), Cape Colony politician
Derek Brownlee (born 1974), Scottish politician
Donald E. Brownlee, American astronomer
Edward M. Brownlee, American sculptor
Gerry Brownlee (born 1956), New Zealand politician
Helen Brownlee, Australian executive 
John Brownlee (statistician) (1868–1927), British statistician
John Brownlee (baritone) (1900–1969), Australian operatic baritone
John Edward Brownlee (1884–1961), Canadian politician
John L. Brownlee, American lawyer, former U.S. Attorney for the Western District of Virginia
Jonny Brownlee (born 1990), British triathlete
Justin Brownlee (born 1988), American-Filipino basketball player
Kimberley Brownlee (born 1978), Canadian philosopher
Lawrence Brownlee, American operatic tenor
Les Brownlee, American army officer and politician
Mark Brownlee (born 1942), New Zealand representative rower
Marques Brownlee (born 1993), American video blogger
Norman Brownlee (born 1896), American jazz musician and orchestra leader
Robert Brownlee (1942–1991), American chemist
Ryan Brownlee (born 1976), American college baseball coach
Scott Brownlee (born 1969), New Zealand representative rower
Shona Brownlee, British skier and RAF aircraftwoman
William Craig Brownlee (1784–1860), American clergyman

See also
 Julia Brownley, American politician
 Brownlie (disambiguation)

References